Lednické Rovne is a village and municipality in Púchov District in the Trenčín Region of north-western Slovakia. The municipality consists of three parts:

Lednické Rovne
Horenická Hôrka
Medné

Geography
The municipality lies at an altitude of 270 metres and covers an area of 10.75 km². It has a population of about 4,215 people.

Demographics 
98.08% inhabitants were Slovaks and 1.03% Czechs

According to the 2001 census the religious makeup was:
85.78% Roman Catholics
10.07% people with no religious affiliation
2.13% Lutherans

Sights 
St. Michael's Church (1926)
Museum (glass)
kaplnka svätej Anny

Industry 
RONA a.s. - glassworks, glasscrafts & glassware (1892)

References

External links
 
 

Villages and municipalities in Púchov District